This is a list of Spanish television related events in 1973.

Events
 31 March: Informe Semanal debuts at La 1, becoming the longest running TV program in Spain, still running 49 years after.
 7 April: Mocedades represents Spain at the Spain in the Eurovision Song Contest 1973 hold in Luxembourg, with the song Eres tú ranking 2nd with 125 points.
 28 June: Rafael Orbe Cano is appointed Director General of RTVE.
 19 July: Los payasos de la tele debut in Televisión Española with their show El gran circo de TVE.
 23 November: Debut of the telefilm Juan Soldado, by Fernando Fernán Gómez, awarded in the Prague Television Festival.

Debuts

La 1

Television shows

La 1

Ending this year

La 1 
 24 horas (1970-1973) 	
 Animales racionales (1972-1973) 	
 Divertido siglo (1972-1973) 	
 Historias de Juan Español (1972-1973) 	
 Juego de letras (1972-1973) 	
 Si las piedras hablaran (1972-1973) 	
 Tres eran tres (1972-1973) 	
 Vuestro amigo Quique (1972-1973)

La 2 
 Más lejos (1971-1973)

Foreign series debuts in Spain

La 1

Births

Deaths
 24 February - Claudio Guerin, director, 34.

See also
1973 in Spain
List of Spanish films of 1973

References 

1973 in Spanish television